Frank Osborne may refer to:

Frank Osborne (California politician), mayor of Alameda, California
Frank Osborne (footballer) (1896–1988), English footballer
Frank I. Osborne (1853–1920), North Carolina politician
Frank M. Osborne (1879–1956), college football player and coach

See also
Francis Osborne (disambiguation)